SM UB-20 was a German Type UB II submarine or U-boat in the German Imperial Navy during World War I. The U-boat was ordered on 30 April 1915 and launched on 26 September 1915. She was commissioned into the German Imperial Navy on 10 February 1916 as SM UB-20. Fifteen crew members died in the event.

Design
A German Type UB II submarine, UB-20 had a displacement of  when at the surface and  while submerged. The submarine was powered by two Körting six-cylinder, four-stroke diesel engines each producing a total , a Siemens-Schuckert electric motor producing , and one propeller shaft.

UB-20 was fitted with two  torpedo tubes, four torpedoes, and one  SK L/40 deck gun. She had a complement of twenty-three crew members and two officers and a 45-second dive time.

Loss 
At noon on 28.07.1917 UB 20 left Ostend for a four-hour sea trial in the area around West Hinder lightship. The boat did not return. (Pos. 51°21'N-02°38'E). The commander's body was washed up on the Jutland coast near Lodbjerg on 03.08.1917 and buried in the local cemetery.

Summary of raiding history

References

Notes

Citations

Bibliography 

 

German Type UB II submarines
U-boats commissioned in 1916
World War I submarines of Germany
Maritime incidents in 1917
U-boats sunk in 1917
U-boats sunk by mines
1915 ships
World War I shipwrecks in the English Channel
Ships built in Hamburg
Ships lost with all hands